Wine has been produced for thousands of years, with evidence of ancient wine production in Georgia from  BC (the earliest known traces of wine),
West Azerbaijan province of Iran from  BC, Armenia from  BC (large-scale production), and Sicily from  BC.
The earliest evidence of a grape and rice mixed based fermented drink sometimes compared to wine was found in ancient China ( BC).

The altered consciousness produced by wine has been considered religious since its origin. The ancient Greeks worshiped Dionysus or Bacchus and the Ancient Romans carried on his cult. Consumption of ritual wine, probably a certain type of sweet wine originally, was part of Jewish practice since Biblical times and, as part of the eucharist commemorating Jesus's Last Supper, became even more essential to the Christian Church. Although Islam nominally forbade the production or consumption of wine, during its Golden Age, alchemists such as Geber pioneered wine's distillation for medicinal and industrial purposes such as the production of perfume.

Wine production and consumption increased, burgeoning from the 15th century onwards as part of European expansion. Despite the devastating 1887 phylloxera louse infestation, modern science and technology adapted and industrial wine production and wine consumption now occur throughout the world.

Prehistory

Vine domestication
The origins of wine predate written records, and modern archaeology is still uncertain about the details of the first cultivation of wild grapevines. It has been hypothesized that early humans climbed trees to pick berries, liked their sugary flavor, and then began collecting them. After a few days with fermentation setting in, juice at the bottom of any container would begin producing low-alcohol wine. According to this theory, things changed around 10,000–8000 BC with the transition from a nomadic to a sedentary style of living, which led to agriculture and wine domestication.

Wild grapes grow in the Caucasus region (Armenia, Azerbaijan, Georgia), the northern Levant, coastal and southeastern Turkey, and northern Iran. The fermenting of strains of this wild Vitis vinifera subsp. sylvestris (the ancestor of the modern wine grape, V. vinifera) would have become easier following the development of pottery during the later Neolithic,  BC. The earliest discovered evidence, however, dates from several millennia later.

Wine fermentation
The earliest archaeological evidence of wine fermentation found has been at sites in Georgia ( BC), Hajj Firuz, West Azerbaijan province of Iran ( BC), Greece ( BC), and Sicily ( BC). The earliest evidence of steady production of wine has been found in Armenia ( BC) while the earliest evidence of a grape and rice mixed based fermented drink was found in ancient China ( BC),. The Iranian jars contained a form of retsina, using turpentine pine resin to more effectively seal and preserve the wine and is the earliest firm evidence of wine production to date. Production spread to other sites in Greater Iran and Greek Macedonia by  BC. The Greek site is notable for the recovery at the site of the remnants of crushed grapes.

The oldest-known winery was discovered in the "Areni-1" cave in Vayots Dzor, Armenia. Dated to  BC, the site contained a wine press, fermentation vats, jars, and cups. Archaeologists also found V. vinifera seeds and vines. Commenting on the importance of the find, McGovern said, "The fact that winemaking was already so well developed in 4000 BC suggests that the technology probably goes back much earlier."

The seeds were from Vitis vinifera, a grape still used to make wine. The cave remains date to about 4000 BC. This is 900 years before the earliest comparable wine remains, found in Egyptian tombs.

The fame of Persian wine has been well known in ancient times. The carvings on the Audience Hall, known as Apadana Palace, in Persepolis, demonstrate soldiers of subjected nations by the Persian Empire bringing gifts to the Persian king. 

Domesticated grapes were abundant in the Near East from the beginning of the early Bronze Age, starting in 3200 BC. There is also increasingly abundant evidence for winemaking in Sumer and Egypt in the 3rd millennium BC.

Legends of discovery 

There are many etiological myths told about the first cultivation of the grapevine and fermentation of wine.

The Biblical Book of Genesis first mentions the production of wine by Noah following the Great Flood.

Greek mythology placed the childhood of Dionysus and his discovery of viticulture at Mount Nysa but had him teach the practice to the peoples of central Anatolia. Because of this, he was rewarded to become a god of wine.

In Persian legend, King Jamshid banished a lady of his harem, causing her to become despondent and contemplate suicide. Going to the king's warehouse, the woman sought out a jar marked "poison" containing the remnants of the grapes that had spoiled and were now deemed undrinkable. After drinking the fermented wine, she found her spirits lifted. She took her discovery to the king, who became so enamored of his new drink that he not only accepted the woman back but also decreed that all grapes grown in Persepolis would be devoted to winemaking.

Antiquity

Ancient China

According to the latest research scholars stated: "Following the definition of the CNCCEF, China has been viewed as "New New World" in the world wine map, despite the fact that grape growing and wine making in China date back to between 7000BC and 9000BC. Winemaking technology and wine culture are rooted in Chinese history and the definition of "New New World" is a misnomer that imparts a Euro centric bias onto wine history and ignores fact." Furthermore, the history of Chinese grape wine has been confirmed and proven to date back 9000 years (7000 BC), including "the earliest attested use" of wild grapes in wine as well as "earliest chemically confirmed alcoholic beverage in the world", according to Adjunct Professor of Anthropology Patrick McGovern, the Scientific Director of the Biomolecular Archaeology Project for Cuisine, Fermented Beverages, and Health at the University of Pennsylvania Museum in Philadelphia. Professor McGovern continued: "The Jiahu discovery illustrates how you should never give up hope in finding chemical evidence for a fermented beverage from the Palaeolithic period. Research very often has big surprises in store. You might think, as I did too, that the grape wines of Hajji Firuz, the Caucasus, and eastern Anatolia would prove to be the earliest alcoholic beverages in the world, coming from the so-called "Cradle of Civilization" in the Near East as they do. But then I was invited to go to China on the other side of Asia, and came back with samples that proved to be even earlier–from around 7000 BC." Furthermore, other scholarly research has stated that: "There is also evidence for various types of alcoholic beverage production, including rice and grape wine, beer, and various liquors including baijiu in China, ca. 7000 B.C." Additionally, Professor Hames' research stated: "The earliest wine, or fermented liquor, came from China, predating Middle Eastern alcohol by a few thousand years. Archeologists have found pottery shards showing remnants of rice and grape wine dating back to 7000 BC in Jiahu village in Henan province."

Archaeologists have discovered production from native "mountain grapes" like V. thunbergii and V. filifolia during the 1st millennium BC. Production of beer had largely disappeared by the time of the Han dynasty, in favor of stronger drinks fermented from millet, rice, and other grains. Although these huangjiu have frequently been translated as "wine", they are typically 20% ABV and considered quite distinct from grape wine within China.

During the 2nd century BC, Zhang Qian's exploration of the Western Regions (modern Xinjiang) reached the Hellenistic successor states of Alexander's empire: Dayuan, Bactria, and the Indo-Greek Kingdom. These had brought viticulture into Central Asia and trade permitted the first wine produced from V. vinifera grapes to be introduced to China.

Wine was imported again when trade with the west was restored under the Tang dynasty, but it remained mostly imperial fare and it was not until the Song that its consumption spread among the gentry. Marco Polo's 14th-century account noted the continuing preference for rice wines continuing in Yuan China.

Ancient Egypt

Wine played an important role in ancient Egyptian ceremonial life. A thriving royal winemaking industry was established in the Nile Delta following the introduction of grape cultivation from the Levant to Egypt  BC. The industry was most likely the result of trade between Egypt and Canaan during the early Bronze Age, commencing from at least the 27th-century BC Third Dynasty, the beginning of the Old Kingdom period. Winemaking scenes on tomb walls, and the offering lists that accompanied them, included wine that was definitely produced in the delta vineyards. By the end of the Old Kingdom, five distinct wines, probably all produced in the Delta, constituted a canonical set of provisions for the afterlife.

Wine in ancient Egypt was predominantly red. Due to its resemblance to blood, much superstition surrounded wine-drinking in Egyptian culture. Shedeh, the most precious drink in ancient Egypt, is now known to have been a red wine and not fermented from pomegranates as previously thought. Plutarch's Moralia relates that, prior to Psammetichus I, the pharaohs did not drink wine nor offer it to the gods "thinking it to be the blood of those who had once battled against the gods and from whom, when they had fallen and had become commingled with the earth, they believed vines to have sprung". This was considered to be the reason why drunkenness "drives men out of their senses and crazes them, inasmuch as they are then filled with the blood of their forebears".

Residue from five clay amphoras in Tutankhamun's tomb, however, have been shown to be that of white wine, so it was at least available to the Egyptians through trade if not produced domestically.

Phoenicia

As recipients of winemaking knowledge from areas to the east, the Phoenicians were instrumental in distributing wine, wine grapes, and winemaking technology throughout the Mediterranean region through their extensive trade network. Their use of amphoras for transporting wine was widely adopted and Phoenician-distributed grape varieties were important in the development of the wine industries of Rome and Greece.

The only Carthaginian recipe to survive the Punic Wars was one by Mago for passum, a raisin wine that later became popular in Rome as well.

Ancient Greece

Much of modern wine culture derives from the practices of the ancient Greeks. The vine preceded both the Minoan and Mycenaean cultures. Many of the grapes grown in modern Greece are grown there exclusively and are similar or identical to the varieties grown in ancient times. Indeed, the most popular modern Greek wine, a strongly aromatic white called retsina, is thought to be a carryover from the ancient practice of lining the wine jugs with tree resin, imparting a distinct flavor to the drink.

The "Feast of the Wine" (Me-tu-wo Ne-wo) was a festival in Mycenaean Greece celebrating the "Month of the New Wine". Several ancient sources, such as the Roman Pliny the Elder, describe the ancient Greek method of using partly dehydrated gypsum before fermentation and some type of lime after, in order to reduce the acidity of the wine. The Greek Theophrastus provides the oldest known description of this aspect of Greek winemaking.

In Homeric mythology, wine is usually served in "mixing bowls" rather than consumed in an undiluted state. Dionysus, the Greek god of revelry and wine—frequently referred to in the works of Homer and Aesop—was sometimes given the epithet Acratophorus, "giver of unmixed wine". Homer frequently refers to the "wine-dark sea" (oīnōps póntos): in lack of a name for the color blue, the Greeks would simply refer to red wine's color.

The earliest reference to a named wine is from the 7th-century BC lyrical poet Alcman, who praises Dénthis, a wine from the western foothills of Mount Taygetus in Messenia, as anthosmías ("flowery-scented"). Chian was credited as the first red wine, although it was known to the Greeks as "black wine". Coan was mixed with sea water and famously salty; Pramnian or Lesbian wine was a famous export as well. Aristotle mentions Lemnian wine, which was probably the same as the modern-day Lemnió varietal, a red wine with a bouquet of oregano and thyme. If so, this makes Lemnió the oldest known varietal still in cultivation.

For Greece, alcohol such as wine had not fully developed into the rich 'cash crop' that it would eventually become toward the peak of its reign. However, as the emphasis of viticulture increased with economic demand so did the consumption of alcohol during the years to come. The Greeks embraced the production aspect as a way to expand and create economic growth throughout the region. Greek wine was widely known and exported throughout the Mediterranean, as amphoras with Greek styling and art have been found throughout the area. The Greeks may have even been involved in the first appearance of wine in ancient Egypt. They introduced the V. vinifera vine to and made wine in their numerous colonies in modern-day Italy, Sicily, southern France, and Spain.

Ancient Persia
Herodotus, writing about the culture of the ancient Persians (in particular, those of Pontus) writes that they were "very fond" of wine and drank it in large quantities.

Ancient Thrace
The works of Homer, Herodotus and other historians of Ancient Greece refer to the ancient Thracians' love for winemaking and consumption, as early as 6000 years ago. Alongside Ancient Greece, the Thracians are considered a potential source for the worshipping of the god of wine, called Dionysus in Greek or Zagreus in Thracian.

Roman Empire

The Roman Empire had an immense impact on the development of viticulture and oenology. Wine was an integral part of the Roman diet and winemaking became a precise business. Virtually all of the major wine-producing regions of Western Europe today were established during the Roman Imperial era. During the Roman Empire, social norms began to shift as the production of alcohol increased. Further evidence suggests that widespread drunkenness and true alcoholism among the Romans began in the first century BC and reached its height in the first century AD. Viniculture expanded so much that by AD  the emperor Domitian was forced to pass the first wine laws on record, banning the planting of any new vineyards in Italy and uprooting half of the vineyards in the provinces in order to increase the production of the necessary but less profitable grain. (The measure was widely ignored but remained on the books until its 280 repeal by Probus.)

Winemaking technology improved considerably during the time of the Roman Empire, though technologies from the Bronze Age continued to be used alongside newer innovations. Vitruvius noted how wine storage rooms were specially built facing north, "since that quarter is never subject to change but is always constant and unshifting", and special smokehouses (fumaria) were developed to speed or mimic aging. Many grape varieties and cultivation techniques were developed. Barrels (invented by the Gauls) and glass bottles (invented by the Syrians) began to compete with terracotta amphoras for storing and shipping wine. The Romans also created a precursor to today's appellation systems, as certain regions gained reputations for their fine wines. The most famous was the white Falernian from the Latian–Campanian border, principally because of its high (~15%) alcohol content. The Romans recognized three appellations: Caucinian Falernian from the highest slopes, Faustian Falernian from the center (named for its one-time owner Faustus Cornelius Sulla, son of the dictator), and generic Falernian from the lower slopes and plain. The esteemed vintages grew in value as they aged, and each region produced different varieties as well: dry, sweet, and light. Other famous wines were the sweet Alban from the Alban Hills and the Caecuban beloved by Horace and extirpated by Nero. Pliny cautioned that such 'first-growth' wines not be smoked in a fumarium like lesser vintages. Pliny and others also named Vinum Hadrianum as one of the most rated wines, along with Praetutian from Ancona on the Adriatic, Mamertine from Messina in Sicily, Rhaetic from Verona, and a few others.

Wine, perhaps mixed with herbs and minerals, was assumed to serve medicinal purposes. During Roman times, the upper classes might dissolve pearls in wine for better health. Cleopatra created her own legend by promising Antony she would "drink the value of a province" in one cup of wine, after which she drank an expensive pearl with a cup of the beverage. Pliny relates that, after the ascension of Augustus, Setinum became the imperial wine because it did not cause him indigestion. When the Western Roman Empire fell during the 5th century, Europe entered a period of invasions and social turmoil, with the Roman Catholic Church as the only stable social structure. Through the Church, grape growing and winemaking technology, essential for the Mass, were preserved.

Over the course of the later Empire, wine production gradually shifted to the east as Roman infrastructure and influence in the western regions gradually diminished. Production in Asia Minor, the Aegean and the Near East flourished through Late Antiquity and the Byzantine era.

The oldest surviving bottle still containing liquid wine, the Speyer wine bottle, belonged to a Roman nobleman and it is dated at 325 or 350 AD.

Medieval period

Medieval Middle East

Lebanon is among the oldest sites of wine production in the world. The Israelite Hosea (780–725 BC) is said to have urged his followers to return to Yahweh so that "they will blossom as the vine, [and] their fragrance will be like the wine of Lebanon". The Phoenicians of its coastal strip were instrumental in spreading wine and viticulture throughout the Mediterranean in ancient times.

However, in the Arabian peninsula, wine was traded by Aramaic merchants, as the climate was not well-suited to the growing of vines. Many other types of fermented drinks, however, were produced in the 5th and 6th centuries, including date and honey wines.

The Muslim conquests of the 7th and 8th centuries brought many territories under Muslim control. Alcoholic drinks were prohibited by law, but the production of alcohol, wine in particular, seems to have thrived. Wine was a subject for many poets, even under Islamic rule, and many khalifas used to drink alcoholic beverages during their social and private meetings. Egyptian Jews leased vineyards from the Fatimid and Mamluk governments, produced wine for sacramental and medicinal use, and traded wine throughout the Eastern Mediterranean. 

Christian monasteries in the Levant and Iraq often cultivated grapevines; they then distributed their vintages in taverns located on monastery grounds. Zoroastrians in Persia and Central Asia also engaged in the production of wine. Though not much is known about their wine trade, they did become known for their taverns. Wine in general found an industrial use in the medieval Middle East as feedstock after advances in distillation by Muslim alchemists allowed for the production of relatively pure ethanol, which was used in the perfume industry. Wine was also for the first time distilled into brandy during this period.

Medieval Europe

In the Middle Ages, wine was the common drink of all social classes in the south, where grapes were cultivated. In the north and east, where few if any grapes were grown, beer and ale were the usual beverages of both commoners and nobility. Wine was exported to the northern regions, but because of its relatively high expense was seldom consumed by the lower classes. Since wine was necessary, however, for the celebration of the Catholic Mass, assuring a supply was crucial. The Benedictine monks became one of the largest producers of wine in France and Germany, followed closely by the Cistercians. Other orders, such as the Carthusians, the Templars, and the Carmelites, are also notable both historically and in modern times as wine producers. The Benedictines owned vineyards in Champagne (Dom Perignon was a Benedictine monk), Burgundy, and Bordeaux in France, and in the Rheingau and Franconia in Germany. In 1435 Count John IV of Katzenelnbogen, a wealthy member of the Holy Roman high nobility near Frankfurt, was the first to plant Riesling, the most important German grape. The nearby winemaking monks made it into an industry, producing enough wine to ship all over Europe for secular use. In Portugal, a country with one of the oldest wine traditions, the first appellation system in the world was created.

A housewife of the merchant class or a servant in a noble household would have served wine at every meal, and had a selection of reds and whites alike. Home recipes for meads from this period are still in existence, along with recipes for spicing and masking flavors in wines, including the simple act of adding a small amount of honey. As wines were kept in barrels, they were not extensively aged, and thus drunk quite young. To offset the effects of heavy alcohol consumption, wine was frequently watered down at a ratio of four or five parts water to one of wine.

One medieval application of wine was the use of snake-stones (banded agate resembling the figural rings on a snake) dissolved in wine as a remedy for snake bites, which shows an early understanding of the effects of alcohol on the central nervous system in such situations.

Jofroi of Waterford, a 13th-century Dominican, wrote a catalogue of all the known wines and ales of Europe, describing them with great relish and recommending them to academics and counsellors. Rashi, a medieval French rabbi called the "father" of all subsequent commentaries on the Talmud and the Tanakh, earned his living as a vintner.

Modern era

Spread and development in the Americas

European grape varieties were first brought to what is now Mexico by the first Spanish conquistadors to provide the necessities of the Catholic Holy Eucharist. Planted at Spanish missions, one variety came to be known as the Mission grape and is still planted today in small amounts. Succeeding waves of immigrants imported French, Italian and German grapes, although wine from those native to the Americas (whose flavors can be distinctly different) is also produced. Mexico became the most important wine producer starting in the 16th century, to the extent that its output began to affect Spanish commercial production. In this competitive climate, the Spanish king sent an executive order to halt Mexico's production of wines and the planting of vineyards.

During the devastating phylloxera blight in late 19th-century Europe, it was found that Native American vines were immune to the pest. French-American hybrid grapes were developed and saw some use in Europe, but more important was the practice of grafting European grapevines to American rootstocks to protect vineyards from the insect. The practice continues to this day wherever phylloxera is present.

Today, wine in the Americas is often associated with Argentina, California and Chile all of which produce a wide variety of wines, from inexpensive jug wines to high-quality varietals and proprietary blends. Most of the wine production in the Americas is based on Old World grape varieties, and wine-growing regions there have often "adopted" grapes that have become particularly closely identified with them. California's Zinfandel (from Croatia and Southern Italy), Argentina's Malbec, and Chile's Carmenère (both from France) are well-known examples.

Until the latter half of the 20th century, American wine was generally viewed as inferior to that of Europe. However, with the surprisingly favorable American showing at the Paris Wine tasting of 1976, New World wine began to garner respect in the land of wine's origins.

Developments in Europe

In the late 19th century, the phylloxera louse brought widespread destruction to grapevines, wine production, and those whose livelihoods depended on them; far-reaching repercussions included the loss of many indigenous varieties. Lessons learned from the infestation led to the positive transformation of Europe's wine industry. Bad vineyards were uprooted and their land turned to better uses. Some of France's best butter and cheese, for example, is now made from cows that graze on Charentais soil, which was previously covered with vines. Cuvées were also standardized, important in creating certain wines as they are known today; Champagne and Bordeaux finally achieved the grape mixes that now define them. In the Balkans, where phylloxera had had little impact, the local varieties survived. However, the uneven transition from Ottoman rule has meant only gradual transformation in many vineyards. It is only in recent times that local varieties have gained recognition beyond "mass-market" wines like retsina.

Australia, New Zealand and South Africa

In the context of wine, Australia, New Zealand, South Africa and other countries without a wine tradition are considered New World producers. Wine production began in the Cape Province of what is now South Africa in the 1680s as a business for supplying ships. Australia's First Fleet (1788) brought cuttings of vines from South Africa, although initial plantings failed and the first successful vineyards were established in the early 19th century. Until quite late in the 20th century, the product of these countries was not well known outside their small export markets. For example, Australia exported mainly to the United Kingdom; New Zealand retained most of its wine for domestic consumption, and South Africa exported to the Kings of Europe. However, with the increase in mechanization and scientific advances in winemaking, these countries became known for high-quality wine. A notable exception to the foregoing is that the Cape Province was the largest exporter of wine to Europe in the 18th century.

East Asia 
In East Asia, the first modern wine industry was Japanese wine, developed in 1874 after grapevines were brought back from Europe. The earliest wine brewing companies in Japan include Suntory and Mercian.

See also

 History of Champagne
 History of Chianti
 History of French wine
 History of Portuguese wine
 History of South African wine
 History of Sherry
 History of Rioja wine
 History of the wine press
 Phoenicians and wine
 Lebanese wine
 Wine in China
 Indian wine
Speyer wine bottle

References

Further reading
 
 
 Emlyn K. Dodd (2020). Roman and Late Antique wine production in the eastern Mediterranean. Archaeopress. 
Muraresku, Brian C. (2020). The Immortality Key: The Secret History of the Religion with No Name. Macmillan USA. 
 Magris, G., Jurman, I., Fornasiero, A. et al. The genomes of 204 Vitis vinifera accessions reveal the origin of European wine grapes. Nat Commun 12, 7240 (2021). https://doi.org/10.1038/s41467-021-27487-y

 
Ancient wine